Bill Bennett (born 1953) is an Australian film director, producer and screenwriter.

Career
Bennett was born in London to Australian parents and brought up in Brisbane. He studied journalism and got a cadetship with the ABC in 1972. He spent two years working in Adelaide on This Day Tonight then went to work for Mike Willesee in Sydney. He then worked on The Big Country and The Australians before moving into feature filmmaking with A Street to Die (1985).

He dropped out of Medicine at the University of Queensland in 1972 and joined the Australian Broadcasting Corporation as a journalist. During a ten-year career as a journalist he won Australia's top TV award, the Logie Awards (Australia's Emmy) for Television Reporter of the Year, and then later for Most Outstanding Documentary. This led him to feature films.

Bennett has directed 16 feature films since 1983. His film Backlash was screened in the Un Certain Regard section at the 1986 Cannes Film Festival. Three years later his film Malpractice would be screened in the same section at the 1989 festival.

Selected filmography
A Street to Die (1985) (feature film): writer/producer/director
Backlash (1986): writer/producer/director
Dear Cardholder 1987 (feature film): writer/producer/director
Jilted (feature film 1988): writer/producer/director
 Malpractice (1989): writer/director
Mortgage (feature film 1990): writer/director
The Banjo & The Bard (drama documentary 1991): writer/producer/director
Last Man Hanged (drama documentary 1992) producer
Spider and Rose (feature film 1994): writer/director
Two if by Sea (feature film 1995): director
Kiss or Kill (feature film 1996): writer/producer/director
In a Savage Land (feature film 1999): writer/producer/director
Tempted (feature film 2000): writer/producer/director
Cut (feature film 2000): writer (uncredited)/producer
 The Nugget (2002): writer/producer/director
Deck Dogz (feature film 2005): producer
Uninhabited (2010): writer/producer/director
PGS - Intuition is your Personal Guidance System (2018) theatrical feature documentary: presenter/writer/producer/director

References

External links

Official website

1953 births
Living people
People from Brisbane
Film directors from London
Australian film directors
Australian film producers
Australian screenwriters